Filip Dagerstål (born 1 February 1997) is a Swedish professional footballer who plays as a defensive midfielder or centre-back for Ekstraklasa club Lech Poznań. He is also under contract with the Russian club FC Khimki, but the contract is suspended.

Club career
Dagerstål, a native of Norrköping began playing in IFK Norrköping at four years old. He spent the 2013 season at loan at IF Sylvia making his professional debut for them versus IF Limhamn Bunkeflo coming on in the last minute in a 2-1 victory. The following 2014 season he made his debut for IFK Norrköping, appearing twice in that years Allsvenskan. He scored his first goal for Norrköping during 2015 against Halmstad BK, and made five more appearances during IFK:s successful run for the Swedish championship in 2015. Dagerstål himself was however again loaned out to IF Sylvia during the conclusion of the season. During the following years he mainly came on as a substitute before stabilizing himself as a starter at the centre back position during the 2019 and 2020 season. Following the 2020 season and 132 league appearances for IFK he chose to not renew his contract, and instead pursue a career abroad.

On 23 January 2021, Dagerstål signed with Russian Premier League club FC Khimki. On 7 March 2022, FIFA introduced special regulations related to the Russian invasion of Ukraine. Those regulations allow foreign players in Russia to unilaterally temporarily suspend their contracts with their Russian clubs until the end of the 2021–22 season and join clubs outside of Russia until that date. On 17 March 2022, Dagerstål used the new rule to return to IFK Norrköping until 30 June. On 5 July 2022, Dagerstål suspended his Khimki contract for the 2022–23 season under the same FIFA regulations that have been extended for a year. On 26 July 2022, Polish side Lech Poznań announced the signing of Dagerstål on a one-year contract.

Career statistics

Club

International

Honours
IFK Norrköping
Allsvenskan: 2015
Svenska Supercupen: 2015

References

External links
  (archive)
 

1997 births
Sportspeople from Norrköping
Living people
Swedish footballers
Sweden international footballers
Sweden under-21 international footballers
Sweden youth international footballers
Association football defenders
IF Sylvia players
IFK Norrköping players
FC Khimki players
Lech Poznań players
Division 2 (Swedish football) players
Ettan Fotboll players
Allsvenskan players
Russian Premier League players
Ekstraklasa players
Swedish expatriate footballers
Expatriate footballers in Russia
Expatriate footballers in Poland
Swedish expatriate sportspeople in Russia
Swedish expatriate sportspeople in Poland
Footballers from Östergötland County